may refer to:

the  command from the Linux operating system, displaying counterpart of the  command
 (AIX command), command from the AIX operating system, intended to display attributes of devices